Serdar Kulbilge (born 7 July 1980) is a Turkish former footballer who played as a goalkeeper.

Career
Fenerbahçe transferred him from Bursaspor at the start of 2005–06 season. He played only at the Turkish Cup matches last season but after Rüştü Reçber's injury and Volkan Demirel's poor performance, suddenly he became the first option of the first eleven.

Turkish National Team coach Fatih Terim called him up for Romania and Malta matches. He received his first senior international cap in a friendly against Romania on August 22, 2007.

On 14 July 2011 he was detained due to allegations of match-fixing in Gençlerbirliği-Fenerbahçe.

Honours
Fenerbahçe
Süper Lig (1): 2006–07
Süper Kupa (1): 2006–07

References

Elazığspor'da 9 oyuncu ayrıldı - PTT 1. Lig, sporx.com, 6 January 2016

External links
 

Guardian Stats Centre

1980 births
Living people
People from Hayrabolu
Turkish footballers
Turkey international footballers
Turkey B international footballers
Turkey under-21 international footballers
Association football goalkeepers
Bursaspor footballers
Fenerbahçe S.K. footballers
Kocaelispor footballers
MKE Ankaragücü footballers
Boluspor footballers
Gaziantepspor footballers
Süper Lig players
Turkey youth international footballers